The 2017 Super League Grand Final was the 20th official Grand Final championship-deciding game of the Super League XXII. It was held at Old Trafford, Manchester on 7 October 2017, kick off 18.00. Leeds Rhinos became champions for a record 8th time after beating Castleford Tigers 24–6 in front of a sell out crowd of 72,827.

Background

Route to Final

Castleford Tigers
Finishing top of the table in the regular season, Castleford qualified directly to the play-off semi-final where they met St Helens  at home. The game went to golden point extra time before a Luke Gale drop goal gave Castleford the win 23–22.

Leeds Rhinos
Leeds also had direct qualification to the semi-final where they hosted Hull F.C. at Headingley. In another close game it was Leeds who triumphed 18–16.

Match details

References

Super League Grand Finals
Leeds Rhinos matches
Grand final
Super League Grand Final